Quincy station is an Amtrak intercity train station in Quincy, Illinois, United States. The station is one of the namesake stations of the Chicago, Burlington and Quincy Railroad (CB&Q or Burlington Route), but today serves as the western terminus of Amtrak's Illinois Zephyr and Carl Sandburg trains. It was built in 1985 and was modeled after a former streetcar station of the early 20th Century. Previously, the Illinois Zephyr crossed the Mississippi River and terminated at the former CB&Q station in West Quincy, Missouri after stopping in Quincy; indeed, the Quincy station was built due to West Quincy being frequently cut off by flooding. The decision to build a station on the Illinois side proved to be prescient when the Great Flood of 1993 destroyed the West Quincy station.

The city has received $6 million to build a new intermodal terminal closer to downtown. In addition to serving as an Amtrak station, it would become the city's Burlington Trailways station and a transfer hub for Quincy Transit Lines. The location has not been finalized yet, but the planners currently favor a terminal near 2nd/Oak intersection, at the site of the city's original train station. However, the funds would not be enough to cover any new rail, which would limit the planners' options.

Connections 

Quincy Transit Lines: Route 4 (Monday-Friday only)

References

External links

Quincy Amtrak Station (USA Rail Guide -- Train Web)

Amtrak stations in Illinois
Former Chicago, Burlington and Quincy Railroad stations
Railway stations in the United States opened in 1985
Buildings and structures in Quincy, Illinois
Transportation buildings and structures in Adams County, Illinois
1985 establishments in Illinois